The Skoplje Football association (Serbo-Croatian: Skopski loptački podsavez / Скопски лоптачки подсавез) was one of the regional football governing bodies under the tutorial of the Football Association of Yugoslavia. It was formed on 18 December 1926 having been earlier part of the Belgrade Football Subassociation. By the time of its formation it included the clubs from the districts of Skopje, Bregalnica, Bitola, Kosovo and Vranje. It was one of the Football Subassociations which formed the football league system in the Kingdom of Yugoslavia.

History
The founding general assembly was held on December 18, 1926, in a restaurant Neznani junak in Skopje where the delegates from all of what was known back then as Southern Serbia were present.  Special envoys of the Football Association of Yugoslavia came from Belgrade, Vladimir Zakić and Bora Jovanović, who were also both members of the Belgrade Subassociation.  At the assembly there were also 21 delegates representing 21 clubs: 7 from Leskovac, 6 from Skoplje, 6 from Bitola, 1 from Vranje and 1 from Strumica.  The newly formed subassociation will be in charge of supervising the football competition of the around 26 clubs found in the geographical area located southern of Leskovac.

The subassociation of Skopje counted 27 clubs in 1929.  In 1940 the number of clubs has raised to 48 and there were 23 football stadiums or fields.

The presidents of the SLP were Đorđe Ristić (1927-1930), Kosta Trnjajski (1930-1934) and Stevan Trivunac (1934-1941).

SLP First Division
The Skoplje Football Subassociation (SLP) was the organiser of the league which will be one among the other Yugoslav Football Subassociation leagues which formed the Yugoslav league system.  During the 1920s the First Division of the Skoplje Subassociation would be ranked as the second national tier, just as all the other First Divisions of all Subassociations, as the champion of the First Division would have access to the national top-flight league, the Yugoslav Championship.  Although only the winners of Belgrade and Zagreb Subassociations would have direct access to the national championship, all the other subassociation champions, including Skopje one, would have to play a qualifying round.  Later during the 1930s the national league was expanded, and an intermediate stage was set where the best qualified teams from all the subassociations would play a group stage in order to qualify for the Yugoslav Championship.

Seasons and champions
This is the list of seasons indicating the league champions.  Whenever the second placed team is also included, it meant that the club also participated in the Yugoslav Championship qualifiers as on some seasons two clubs qualified.

1928: Pobeda Skopje
1929: Pobeda Skopje
1930: Note: Jug Skopje, SSK Skopje and Sparta Skopje finish the season with equal number of points with the rules dictating that the goal difference should indicate the champion in these cases.  However, due to irregularities during the autumn part of the season, the SLP was unable to declare a winner and failed to send a representative to the national championship qualifiers.
1931: The season was not finished as the entire national league system modified.
1932: SSK Skopje (second placed Gragjanski Skopje also participated in the play-offs)
1933: SSK Skopje
1934: SSK Skopje
1935:
1936: Gragjanski Skopje
1937: Note: It was adopted a system where the clubs competing in the national championship do not compete at subassociation level as well.
1938: Gragjanski Skopje
1939: Gragjanski Skopje
1940: SSK Skopje
1941: SSK Skopje

In 1940 SSK Skopje plays as SLP champion the qualifiers to the Yugoslav Championship.  It plays in the Group 2.  In skips the first round and in the second eliminates Borac Petrograd (6:0, 0:2), then in the third round it is eliminated by FK Vojvodina (2:2, 1:4), however due to the restructuring of the league and the formation of two separate leagues, the Serbian and the Croato-Slovenian, SSK Skopje gets the chance to play the qualifiers to the Serbian League, however it fails to qualify as in the first round they lost against Balšić Podgorica (1:2, 0:1).  The curiosity is that Gragjanski Skopje, because of having been part in the Yugoslav Championship in the previous season, got direct qualification into the Serbian League, having finished 5th, 10 points behind the winner BSK Belgrade, but only 3 points behind SK Jugoslavija who finished in second place.

In 1941 SSK Skopje won the SLP booking that way their place in the qualifiers for the 1940–41 Serbian League.  After winning in the first round Železničar Niš (2:1), in the second they made an impressive result against Jedinstvo Čačak (9:3, 1:1) however they surprisingly lost against Jugoslavija Jabuka (2:4, 2:4).  Gragjanski Skopje by having finished in 5th place in the previous season had a guaranteed spot in the League however this year the results were not that impressive with the team finishing 8th among 10 teams.

References

Football governing bodies in Yugoslavia
Football in North Macedonia
1927 establishments in Yugoslavia
Sports organizations established in 1927